"For Your Love" is a rock song written by Graham Gouldman and recorded by English group the Yardbirds.  Released in March 1965, it was their first top ten hit in both the UK and the US.  The song was a departure from the group's blues roots in favour of a commercial pop rock sound. Guitarist Eric Clapton disapproved of the change and it influenced him to leave the group.

Background

Gouldman wrote the song at the age of 18 while working by day in a gentlemen's outfitters near Salford Docks and playing by night with the semi-professional Manchester band the Mockingbirds. Gouldman cited the Beatles as his influence:
 The Yardbirds were performing on a Christmas show at the Hammersmith Odeon in London and song publisher Ronnie Beck played the song to their manager, Giorgio Gomelsky, and the band.

Recording
The Yardbirds recorded "For Your Love" at the IBC Studios in London on 1 February 1965.  The majority of the song was recorded with singer Keith Relf and drummer Jim McCarty backed by session musician Ron Prentice on bowed bass, Denny Piercy on bongos, and  Brian Auger on harpsichord. Guitarists Eric Clapton and Chris Dreja perform only during the song's middle break section.  Bassist Paul Samwell-Smith assumed the production duties and is listed as musical director on the 45. At the conclusion of the session, Auger wondered, "Who, in their right mind, is going to buy a pop single with harpsichord on it?"

Releases and charts
Shortly after its release by Columbia on 5 March 1965, it became a hit in the UK.  When it was released a month later by Epic Records in the US, it became the group's first charting single. By then, Clapton had already left the group for various reasons, including their more commercial aspirations.

Fleetwood Mac version
Fleetwood Mac issued "For Your Love" as a single in 1973.  Cash Box called this version "a totally contemporary, yet still hard rocking treatment from this great British band of rockers" that maintains the essence of the original tune.

References

1965 songs
1965 singles
The Yardbirds songs
Songs written by Graham Gouldman
RPM Top Singles number-one singles
Columbia Graphophone Company singles
Epic Records singles